Myrrhinus or Myrrinous was a deme of ancient Attica. It lay to the east of Prasiae. Artemis Colaenis was worshipped at Myrrhinus; and in one of the inscriptions recovered at Merenda mention is made of a temple of Artemis Colaenis.

The site of Myrrhinus is located near modern Merenda.

People
Eurymedon of Myrrhinus, brother-in-law of Plato
 Phaedrus (Athenian), aristocrat depicted in the dialogues of Plato
 Speusippus, philosopher and Plato's nephew
 Tettigidaea (Ancient Greek: Τεττιγιδαία) of Myrrhinus, Nicostratus (comic poet) was in love with her, and he jump from the Leucas Rock in order to be cured from the love.

References

Populated places in ancient Attica
Former populated places in Greece
Demoi